Regatta Day may refer to:

 Royal Hobart Regatta, an annual three-day regatta in Hobart, Tasmania, Australia
 Royal St. John's Regatta, an annual regatta and public holiday in St. John's, Newfoundland, Canada